The Namibia Davis Cup team represents Namibia in Davis Cup tennis competition and is governed by the Namibia Tennis Association. They did not compete between 2010–2011 and in 2017.

They best performance was in 2018, when they went undefeated to the 2019 Davis Cup Europe/Africa Zone Group II.

History
Namibia competed in its first Davis Cup in 2000.

Current team (2022) 

 Codie Schalk Van Schalkwyk 
 Connor Henry Van Schalkwyk (Junior player)
 Steyn Dippenaar
 Risto Shilongo
 Nguvitjita Hinda

All players

All the players that represented Namibia since 2000.

Statistics
''Last updated: Namibia – Benin; 14 September 2019

Record
Total: 33–41 (44.6%)

Head-to-head record (2000–)

Record against continents

Record by decade
2000–2009: 16–28 (36.4%)
2010–2019: 17–13 (56.7%)

Note: 
1 In 2001 on the Relegation play-off group Togo-Namibia will not be played as they already played against each other in the previous round. Furthermore, the points gained at the matches played in the previous round will count for the table.
2 In 2002 on the Relegation play-off group Lithuania-Namibia will not be played as they already played against each other in the previous round. Furthermore, the points gained at the matches played in the previous round will count for the table.
3 In 2003 on the Relegation play-off group Madagascar-Namibia will not be played as they already played against each other in the previous round. Furthermore, the points gained at the matches played in the previous round will count for the table.
4 In 2004 on the Promotional play-off group Ghana-Namibia will not be played as they already played against each other in the previous round. Furthermore, the points gained at the matches played in the previous round will count for the table.
5 In 2005 on the Relegation play-off group Kenya-Namibia will not be played as they already played against each other in the previous round. Furthermore, the points gained at the matches played in the previous round will count for the table.
6 In 2006 on the Promotional play-off group Denmark-Namibia will not be played as they already played against each other in the previous round. Furthermore, the points gained at the matches played in the previous round will count for the table.
7 In 2007 on the Relegation play-off group Zimbabwe-Namibia will not be played as they already played against each other in the previous round. Furthermore, the points gained at the matches played in the previous round will count for the table.
8 In 2009 on the Relegation play-off group Andorra-Namibia will not be played as they already played against each other in the previous round. Furthermore, the points gained at the matches played in the previous round will count for the table.

See also
Davis Cup
Namibia Fed Cup team

External links

Davis Cup teams
Davis Cup
Davis Cup